Parc de la Creueta del Coll ("Park of the Corner of the Hill") is a park in the Gràcia and Horta districts of Barcelona, Catalonia, Spain. The park was created from an abandoned quarry as part of the nou urbanisme developments during the 1992 Summer Olympics by architects Martorell, Bohigas and Mackay.

The park contains the sculpture Elogi de l'Aigua, by Basque sculptor Eduardo Chillida, a massive concrete claw suspended by steel cables above a flooded quarry.

Another steel sculpture, Escultura by Ellsworth Kelly is near the entrance gate.

References

 

Culture in Barcelona
Creuta del Coll
Gràcia